Hydriomena perfracta, the shattered hydriomena, is a species of geometrid moth in the family Geometridae. It is found in North America.

The MONA or Hodges number for Hydriomena perfracta is 7229.

References

Further reading

 
 
 
 

Hydriomena